Tolv i topp is a 1997 cover album from Swedish dansband Lotta Engbergs, mostly featuring covers from 1960s and 1970s hits/schlagers. The album was recorded after Lotta Engberg in 1996 hosted the TV show "Fem i topp" in TV4, and sung the songs. The album was released in the name of the dansband Lotta Engbergs. The album peaked at # 23 at the Swedish album chart.

Track listing

Chart positions

References 

1997 albums
Covers albums